Lopharthrum is a monotypic moth genus of the family Erebidae erected by George Hampson in 1895. Its only species, Lopharthrum comprimens, was first described by Francis Walker in 1858. It is found from the Indian subregion to New Guinea and the Solomons.

References

Calpinae
Moth genera